Anakpawis is a party-list in the Philippines. The party-list is the electoral wing of the radical trade union movement Kilusang Mayo Uno and the peasant group Kilusang Mangbubukid ng Pilipinas.

Known for its radical pro-labor and peasant stand, Anakpawis is known for its campaign for a ₱125 across-the-board wage increase for workers, as well as the genuine agrarian reform bill to redistribute land to landless peasants.

In the 2004 elections for the House of Representatives the party-list obtained 538,396 votes (4.2320% of the nationwide vote) and two seats (Crispin B. Beltran and Rafael V. Mariano). In the May 14, 2007 election, the party won 1 seat in the nationwide party-list vote.

Electoral performance

Representatives to Congress

13th Congress (2004–2007) - Crispin Beltran, Rafael V. Mariano
14th Congress (2007–2010) - Crispin Beltran (replaced by Rafael V. Mariano after his death in 2008), Joel Manglungsod
15th Congress (2010–2013) - Rafael V. Mariano
16th Congress (2013–2016) - Fernando Hicap
17th Congress (2016–2019) - Ariel Casilao
18th Congress (2019–2022) - None
19th Congress (2022–present) - None

See also
Katipunan ng mga Anakpawis sa Pilipinas

References

External links
Kilusang Mayo Uno
 

Party-lists represented in the House of Representatives of the Philippines
Labor parties in the Philippines
Political parties established in 2003
Left-wing parties in the Philippines
National Democracy Movement (Philippines)
Socialist parties in the Philippines